O'Malley (postcode: 2606) is an affluent suburb of Canberra, Australian Capital Territory. There are numerous embassies in O'Malley. The suburb is named after King O'Malley, who was the politician who arranged the competition for a design for Canberra. Streets in O'Malley are named with Aboriginal words.

Population
In the 2021 Census, there were 928 people in O'Malley. 53.0% of people were born in Australia and 52.9% of people only spoke English at home. The most common responses for religion were No Religion (26.4%) and Catholic (24.8%).

Restrictions
Wood fire heaters are banned in the newer East O'Malley area to due concerns of air quality in that valley

Geology
Deakin Volcanics green-grey and purple rhyodacite are under the suburb.  To the east in the valley bottom is Deakin Volcanics purple and green tuff and up the slopes of Mount Mugga Mugga are Deakin Volcanics coarse dark purple rhyodacite.

Embassies

References

Suburbs of Canberra
Diplomatic districts